David P. Gushee is a Christian ethicist and public intellectual.

Work and membership
David P. Gushee is Distinguished University Professor of Christian Ethics and formerly the Director of the Center for Theology and Public Life at Mercer University. He is also Chair of Christian Social Ethics at the Faculty of Religion and Theology at Vrije Universiteit Amsterdam in cooperation with the International Baptist Theological Study Centre (IBTS Centre) in Amsterdam. He was formerly the Graves Professor of Moral Philosophy and the Senior Fellow of the Carl F. H. Henry Center for Christian Leadership at Union University in Jackson, Tennessee.

Gushee was elected in 2015 Vice President and 2018 Vice President of the American Academy of Religion. In January 2016 he was elected President-Elect of the Society of Christian Ethics.

Gushee served as president of Evangelicals for Human Rights, an organization advocating for an end to torture, especially that sponsored by the United States government; this organization has since become the New Evangelical Partnership for the Common Good. Gushee has also served on The Constitution Project's Detainee Treatment Task Force since December 2010. He helped draft the Evangelical Climate Initiative's Call to Action. He served on the Sojourners board of directors.

Gushee is a columnist for Baptist News Global, and has written for Religion News Service, Christianity Today, The Washington Post, and Sojourners.

Scholarship and recognition
Gushee is an internationally recognized Holocaust scholar and ethicist, based on his 1994 book Righteous Gentiles of the Holocaust. He was appointed in 2008 by the United States Holocaust Memorial Museum to serve as a member of the Church Relations and the Holocaust Committee. He taught a summer seminar for college faculty at the USHMM.

Gushee's most important books include Kingdom Ethics (with Glen Stassen, 2003), The Sacredness of Human Life (2013), and Changing Our Mind (2014). Kingdom Ethics was Christianity Today's Theology/Ethics Book of the Year for 2004, and has been translated into eight languages. A second edition was released in 2016.

Gushee is the author of well over one hundred scholarly articles, chapters and reviews and has written or edited twenty books.

Gushee was ordained to the Gospel Ministry at Walnut Hills Baptist Church in Williamsburg, Virginia in 1987.

He has received the Evangelical Press Association's Christian Journalism Award for 1991, 1992 and 1997, recognition of excellence in opinion writing.

Gushee was granted an honorary Doctor of Divinity (D.D.) degree in May 2009 by the John Leland Center for Theological Studies.

Education
Gushee received his Ph.D. in Christian ethics from Union Theological Seminary in 1993, having earned his M.Phil. from Union Theological Seminary in 1990. Gushee earned his M.Div. from Southern Baptist Theological Seminary in 1987.  He graduated Phi Beta Kappa with a B.A. from the College of William and Mary in 1984.

Controversy
As a Christian ethicist, Gushee has periodically been outspoken about current controversial societal topics. His positions on such issues as climate change, torture, and LGBT rights have often put him into conflict with his traditional evangelical constituency.  For example, In 2015, Russell Moore, also a well known Evangelical ethicist, implied that Gushee was not a true Evangelical because of his change of belief supporting LGBT civil rights. Gushee describes himself as "post evangelical” and attends both Catholic Mass and Baptist services.

Books

After Evangelicalism: The Path to a New Christianity. Louisville, KY: Westminster John Knox Press. 2020. 
Introducing Christian Ethics: Core Convictions for Christians Today. Ann Arbor: Front Edge Publishing. 2022. ISBN 978-1641801249

References

External links

Year of birth missing (living people)
Living people
Christian ethicists
Historians of the Holocaust
College of William & Mary alumni
Southern Baptist Theological Seminary alumni
Union Theological Seminary (New York City) alumni
Constitution Project